Czarnorzeki-Strzyżów Landscape Park (Czarnorzecko-Strzyżowski Park Krajobrazowy) is a protected area (Landscape Park) in south-eastern Poland, established in 1993, covering an area of .

The Park lies within Podkarpackie Voivodeship: in Brzozów County (Gmina Jasienica Rosielna), Dębica County (Gmina Brzostek), Krosno County (Gmina Korczyna, Gmina Wojaszówka) and Strzyżów County (Gmina Strzyżów, Gmina Frysztak, Gmina Wiśniowa).

Landscape parks in Poland
Parks in Podkarpackie Voivodeship